Johnny Lyons (15 January 1876 – 30 July 1910) was an Australian rules footballer who played with Collingwood in the Victorian Football League (VFL).

Notes

External links 

Johnny Lyons's profile at Collingwood Forever

1876 births
1910 deaths
Australian rules footballers from Victoria (Australia)
Collingwood Football Club players